The deceleration parameter  in cosmology is a dimensionless measure of the cosmic acceleration of the expansion of space in a Friedmann–Lemaître–Robertson–Walker universe.  It is defined by:

where  is the scale factor of the universe and the dots indicate derivatives by proper time. The expansion of the universe is said to be "accelerating" if  (recent measurements suggest it is), and in this case the deceleration parameter will be negative. The minus sign and name "deceleration parameter" are historical; at the time of definition  was expected to be negative, so a minus sign was inserted in the definition to make  positive in that case. Since the evidence for the accelerating universe in the 1998–2003 era, it is now believed that  is positive therefore the present-day value  is negative (though  was positive in the past before dark energy became dominant). In general  varies with cosmic time, except in a few special cosmological models; the present-day value is denoted . 

The  Friedmann acceleration equation can be written as

Defining the critical density as

 
and the density parameters , substituting  in the acceleration equation gives

where the density parameters are at the relevant cosmic epoch.  
At the present day  is negligible, and if  (cosmological constant) this simplifies to 
 
(Note that the CMB, as a high-redshift measurement, does not directly measure ; but its value can be inferred by fitting cosmological models to the CMB data, then calculating  from the other measured parameters as above).

The time derivative of the Hubble parameter can be written in terms of the deceleration parameter:

However observations of distant type Ia supernovae indicate that  is negative; the expansion of the universe is accelerating. This is an indication that the gravitational attraction of matter, on the cosmological scale, is more than counteracted by the negative pressure of dark energy, in the form of either quintessence or a positive cosmological constant.

The experimental effort to discriminate these cases with supernovae actually revealed negative , evidence for cosmic acceleration, which has subsequently grown stronger.

References

Physical cosmology